General elections were held in Chile on 19 November 2017, including presidential, parliamentary and regional elections.

Voters went to the polls to elect:
 A President of the Republic to serve a four-year term.
 Twenty three of 43 members of the Senate to serve an eight-year term in the National Congress.
 The full 155 members of the Chamber of Deputies to serve a four-year term in the National Congress.
 The full 278 members of the regional boards to serve a four-year term.

In the presidential election, former president Sebastián Piñera received a lower-than-expected 36% of the vote,  nearly 14 points ahead of senator Alejandro Guillier, who was backed by the sitting administration. In the runoff election on 17 December 2017, Piñera surprised many by defeating Guillier with 54% of the vote, and turnout was two points higher than in the first round.

In the parliamentary elections, the Chile Vamos coalition, which supported Piñera's candidacy, won 46% of the Chamber of Deputies and 44% of the Senate, while the governing New Majority alliance, which competed without the Christian Democrats for the first time in 28 years, failed to retain its majority in both chambers, receiving just 28% and 35% in the lower and upper chambers, respectively. The leftist bloc Broad Front elected 20 deputies (13%) and gained one senator. The Christian Democratic Party received 9% of the lower chamber and secured 14% of the Senate.

Following an election reform in 2015, the Chamber of Deputies grew in size to 155 members from the previous 120, while the Senate increased its membership from 38 to 43 after this election, and will grow to 50 following the election in 2021. Multi-seat constituencies were reestablished, replacing the previous binomial system of two seats per district, installed by the outgoing Pinochet dictatorship in 1989. For the first time, a 40% gender quota was put in place for candidates of each political party in parliamentary elections.

All the newly elected officials began their terms on 11 March 2018.

This was the first non-primary election in which Chilean citizens voted from abroad.

Presidential primaries

According to the Constitution, primaries are voluntary but its results are binding. Sebastián Piñera won the Chile Vamos primary with 58% of the vote while Beatriz Sánchez became the Broad Front (Frente Amplio) nominee with nearly 68%.

Presidential candidates

Chile Vamos

Nominee

Candidates

The former president was proclaimed as candidate by the Independent Regionalist Party on 17 December 2016, by the Independent Democratic Union on 24 March 2017, and two days later by his former party, National Renewal. On 2 July 2017 Sebastián Piñera won the Chile Vamos primary, thereby officially becoming a presidential candidate. On 8 July 2017, Amplitude —a party that is not member of Chile Vamos— proclaimed him as its candidate. On 6 August 2017, Political Evolution, which had supported Felipe Kast during the primaries, officially joined Piñera's campaign team.

Sebastián Piñera won the primary with 58% of the vote.

The Force of the Majority

Presidential nominee

Candidates

Alejandro Guillier was proclaimed by the Social Democrat Radical Party as candidate on 7 January 2017. On 9 April 2017 he was chosen by the Socialist Party's Central Committee as its candidate after a secret election in which he beat former president Ricardo Lagos by nearly two-thirds of the vote; he was proclaimed as candidate by that party on 21 April 2017. On 7 May 2017, the Communist Party proclaimed him as their candidate. On 13 May 2017 the Party for Democracy unanimously proclaimed him as their candidate in a show of hands. As the New Majority coalition failed to organize a primary and Guillier decided to stay as an independent, he was forced to collect thousands of signatures in order to compete. On 4 August 2017 he officially registered his candidacy before the Servel, presenting 61,403 signatures, more than the 33 thousand needed to register an independent candidacy.

Broad Front

Nominee

Candidates

The journalist announced on 21 March 2017 during her own radio show that she was quitting her job to think about the possibility of running for president. On 31 March 2017 she gained the official support from both Democratic Revolution and Autonomist Movement. She launched her candidacy on 3 April 2017 at a rally near Plaza Baquedano in Santiago. On 16 April 2017 she was proclaimed as candidate by the Humanist Party, and on 23 April 2017 the Libertarian Left gave her its support. On 9 May 2017 she was proclaimed as candidate by the Poder party, and four days later by the Progressive Democratic Movement. On 14 May 2017 the Autonomous Left proclaimed her as their candidate. On 29 May 2017 the Liberal Party proclaimed her as their candidate, while on 6 June 2017, the Green Ecologist Party did the same. On 2 July 2017 she won the Broad Front primary with nearly 68% of the vote. Her primary win was officially sanctioned by the Election Court (Tricel) on 24 July 2017 during a ceremony in Santiago. On 31 July 2017, Sánchez presented her campaign team, which included members of the Equality Party, which had supported her primary opponent, Alberto Mayol.

Other candidates

Unsuccessful candidacies

Carola Canelo (Ind.): The lawyer and academic announced on 16 November 2016 her intention to run for president. On 21 August 2017 —the deadline to register candidacies— the press reported that her official website stated that she had only gathered 6,257 out of the 33,493 signatures needed to register an independent candidacy.
Tomás Jocelyn-Holt (Ind.): The 2013 candidate announced on 7 June 2017, during a television interview, that he was willing to run again as president, representing The Other Chile (El Otro Chile) coalition. However, on 15 August 2017 he said he had failed to gather the required number of signatures to register as an independent candidate though he vowed to run in 2022.
Nicolás Larraín (Ind.): On 12 December 2016, the television host announced his presidential candidacy. On 19 June 2017 he announced he was quitting his candidacy and giving his support to then Chile Vamos primary candidate for Evópoli Felipe Kast.
Franco Parisi (Ind.): The former presidential candidate stated on 17 January 2017 he was mulling over the possibility of running again in 2017 after the Regional Democracy party said it would support him. On 4 August 2017, he put an end to his presidential candidacy, opting instead to compete for a seat in the Senate.
Luis Riveros (Ind.): The former rector of the University of Chile said on 28 October 2016 he was willing to run for president. On 7 April 2017, La Tercera daily announced he was stepping out of the race.

Opinion polling

Presidential election

Results

Chamber of Deputies election
Revised provisional results.

Results by regions

Senate election
Revised provisional results.

Results by region

Arica and Parinacota

Tarapacá

Atacama

Valparaíso Region

Maule

Araucanía

Aysén

Regional Boards election
Revised provisional results.

References

External links
Elections in Chile (Interior Ministry)

Presidential elections in Chile
Chile
General
Chile
Chile
Election and referendum articles with incomplete results